The Philidor position is an endgame position in chess where one side with only a rook defends against an opponent with a rook and a pawn.

Philidor position may also refer to:

 Philidor position, a rook and bishop versus rook endgame position
 Philidor position, a queen versus rook endgame position
 Philidor's mate, a checkmating pattern